Percival George Gale (22 May 1865 – 7 September 1940) was an English first-class cricketer.

Gale was born in at Kensington in May 1865. He made his debut in first-class cricket for London County against Surrey at Crystal Palace in 1901. Gale played first-class cricket for London County until 1904, making ten appearances. He scored 130 runs in his ten matches, at an average of 9.28 and a high score of 40. He also bowled sixteen wicketless overs across his ten matches, conceding 37 runs. In addition to playing first-class cricket for London County, Gale also made a single appearance for W. G. Grace's personal XI against the touring West Indians at Crystal Palace in 1906. 

Outside of the first-class game, Gale played for with success for Walham Green and was vice-president of the Wanderers Cricket Club. He also served in the Metropolitan Special Constabulary, rising to the rank of chief inspector. Gale died at Croydon in September 1940.

References

External links

1865 births
1940 deaths
Sportspeople from Kensington
English cricketers
London County cricketers
W. G. Grace's XI cricketers
Metropolitan Special Constabulary officers